Hotel Deauville may refer to:
Hotel Deauville (Miami), Florida, US
Hotel Deauville (Manhattan), New York, US
Hotel Deauville (Havana), Cuba